Stenocercus apurimacus, Fritts's whorltail iguana, is a species of lizard of the Tropiduridae family. It is found in Peru.

References

Stenocercus
Reptiles described in 1972
Endemic fauna of Peru
Reptiles of Peru